Melbourne Victory Football Club is an Australian association football club based in Melbourne, Victoria. The club was formed as one of the foundation teams in the professional A-League, which commenced in 2005–06. The Victory won the A-League Championship for the first time in 2007. Since then, the club has won a further three Championships along with three Premierships and an FFA Cup title.

This chronological list comprises all those who have held the position of manager of the first team of Melbourne Victory. Each manager's entry includes his dates of tenure and the club's overall competitive record (in terms of matches won, drawn and lost), honours won and significant achievements while under his care. Caretaker managers are included, as well as those who have been in permanent charge.

Managers
 Statistics are sourced from ALeagueStats.com. Win percentage is rounded to two decimal places.
 Only first-team competitive matches are counted. Wins, losses and draws are results at the final whistle; the results of penalty shoot-outs are not counted.
 Statistics are complete up to and including the match played on 23 May 2021.

Key
 M = matches played; W = matches won; D = matches drawn; L = matches lost; GF = Goals for; GA = Goals against; Win % = percentage of total matches won
   Managers with this background and symbol in the "Name" column are italicised to denote caretaker appointments.
   Managers with this background and symbol in the "Name" column are italicised to denote caretaker appointments promoted to full-time manager.

References

Melbourne Victory